Fraissinet-de-Fourques is a commune in the Lozère department in southern France.

See also
Communes of the Lozère department
Causse Méjean

References

Fraissinetdefourques